Maame Harris Tani, sometimes known as "Grace" (c. 1870s/1880s – 1958) was a Ghanaian religious figure.

Born in the town of Krisan in the Western Region of what would become Ghana, Tani was a member of the Nzema people. She gained a reputation as a healer and herbalist early in life. In 1914 she became the first person converted by William Wadé Harris, whose third wife she became. She developed a talent for spirit possession, and with Papa Kwesi John Nackabah became a leader in the Twelve Apostles Church of Ghana when Harris returned to Ivory Coast. The church remains popular today; central to its existence is the healing ritual known as sunsum edwuma, or "spiritual work", performed with water in basins and developed by Maame Tani in the 1920s.

References

Year of birth uncertain
1958 deaths
Ghanaian religious leaders
Converts to Protestantism
People from Western Region (Ghana)
20th-century religious leaders
Female religious leaders